Keepin' It Real is the second album of German hip-hop group C-Block, released in 1998.

Track listing

Chart

References

External links
 Keepin' It Real at Discogs

C-Block albums
1998 albums